is a Japanese children's superhero picture book series written by Takashi Yanase, running from 1973 until the author’s death in 2013. The series has been adapted into an anime entitled , which is one of the most popular anime series among young children in Japan. The series follows the adventures of Anpanman, a superhero with an anpan (a red bean paste filled pastry) for a head, who protects the world from an evil anthropomorphic germ named Baikinman.

Heavily merchandised, the Anpanman characters appear on virtually every imaginable children's product in Japan, ranging from clothes and video games to toys and snack foods. The series spawned a short-lived spin-off show featuring one of the popular recurring characters on the show, Omusubiman. Anpanman overtook Hello Kitty as Japan's top-grossing character in 2002, and has remained the country's top-grossing character . Anpanman has sold over 80million books as of February 2019, and the franchise generated  in total retail sales revenue by 2013. Works inspired by Anpanman include the manga and anime series One-Punch Man, and the K-pop song "Anpanman" by BTS.

Development 
During the Second World War, Takashi Yanase faced starvation countless times, which made him dream about eating an anpan. This inspired the creation of Anpanman.

Characters 
In each episode, Anpanman fights with Baikinman and saves people. He goes on daily patrols around the house of Uncle Jam. He is a symbol of justice, fighting for good every day. Anpanman has a long history, and new characters are frequently introduced, keeping the series fresh.  In 2009, Anpanman was verified as a Guinness World Record Holder for the highest number of characters in an animated franchise, with a total of 1,768 characters appearing in the first 980 episodes of the TV series and the first 20 films.

Heroes 

 
 
 The main character of the anime, whose head is an Anpan made by Uncle Jam. His name comes from his being a man whose head is made of bread (Japanese: pan) that is filled with red bean paste (Japanese: anko) called an anpan. When translated into English, Anpanman means "Bean Bun Man." He doesn't need to eat or drink to sustain himself and has never been seen eating, as it is believed the bean jam in his head allows him to sustain himself in this manner. His weaknesses are water and anything else that makes his head dirty. In order to prevent his head from getting wet when underwater or in wet weather, he wears a bubble-like helmet to protect it. He regains his health and strength when Uncle Jam bakes him a new head and replaces the old head. Anpanman's damaged head, with his eyes turning into X's, flies off his shoulders once a new baked head replaces it. Anpanman was born when a shooting star landed in Uncle Jam's oven while he was baking an anpan. In movies and other media, the shooting stars that brought Anpanman to life were called “the stars of life”. Anpanman has two special attacks; An-punch and An-kick (with stronger variations of both). When Anpanman comes across a starving creature or person, he lets them eat a part of his head. This can also make him weaker and causes him to replace his head to regain his strength. He also has super hearing, which allows him to respond to anyone who calls his name out in distress, anywhere in the world.
 
  (1988–2019), Kōichi Yamadera (2019–present), Barry J Tarallo (English)
 The creator of Anpanman and a very kind baker. He is a skilled cook with knowledge of nearly everything in the world.
 
 
 Assistant to Uncle Jam. She is dedicated and hard-working but prone to forgetting things. Her name literally translates to "Butter Girl." She makes and mends the capes of Anpanman and the other heroes in the story.
 
 
 A dog that lives in Uncle Jam's bakery. In the manga, he became Anpanman's loyal friend after he saved his life. In the anime, a young Anpanman finds Cheese starving during his very first patrol, and gives him a part of his head to eat. Cheese tends to be an effective sidekick when he's around.
 
 
 Another of Anpanman's friends. His head is made from currypan, a pastry filled with red-hot curry. He is quick-tempered and hot-headed on the surface but gives way to a kind and sentimental interior. Tends to be the strongman of the trio. Wields the Curry-punch and Curry-kick, which are similar to the fighting techniques of Anpanman's other sidekicks. However, he can also use the hot curry concealed in his head as a weapon, using it to burn villains. He first appeared in episode 2b.
 
 
 A friend of Anpanman. His head is made from sliced white bread (Japanese: shoku pan). He is handsome and level-headed and kind, but narcissistic. Tends to be the thinker of the trio. His job when not helping Anpanman is serving lunch to the schoolchildren. Dokin-chan has a crush on him. Wields the Shoku-punch and Shoku-kick, which are similar to Anpanman's fighting techniques. He also has a multi-functional delivery van known as the Shokupanman-go with many implements to help avoid trouble. He first appeared in episode 3b. In the Tubi Dub, he is called Bread Head Man.
 
 
 Anpanman's friend. Her head is made from melon bread. She is extremely softhearted, being caring and sensitive, and is sometimes clever. When she's in trouble, she usually needs Anpanman or somebody else to save her, or if there is no one available, she calls out for her sister, Rollpanna. Sometimes she likes hanging out with Cheese. Her special attack, the Melo-Melo Punch, makes bad guys woozy with affection or awakens others from a deep sleep. She first appeared in episode 200.
 
 
 Melonpanna's older sister who has two hearts: A red one of goodness, and thanks to Baikinman, a blue one of evil. The sight of Anpanman can trigger her evil heart while the sight of Melonpanna can trigger her good one. She started out in the series as a loner at Baikinman's beck and call, but she broke from his power and wanders the world doing good deeds, but stays away from others for fear of what she would do if her black heart is triggered. Her nickname is "The tragic heroine". Her weapon is a gymnastics ribbon, which she can use to wrap up her enemies or cause tornadoes. She first appeared in episode 300.
 
 
 The youngest of Anpanman's friends and the foster brother of Melonpanna and Rollpanna. He is 6 years old. His head is made from a cream bun and his eyes look like those of a panda's. Despite his immaturity and relative weakness as compared to Anpanman and his hero friends, he is courageous, protective of his friends, and has a "never give up" attitude. He has an immature character causes him to sometimes get into petty squabbles and competitions of one-upmanship with the other younger characters on the show. Because his head resembles a hand, he has a special headbutt attack called the "Guu-Choki-Punch" (Guu-Choki-Pa means Rock, Scissors, Paper in Japanese). Relatively powerful when it connects, it fails to connect more often than not. He first appeared in episode 469.

Villains 
 
 
 The villain from the "Germ Planet" and is the leader of the Viruses. His Japanese name means "Bacteria Man". His ambition is to destroy Anpanman and spread bacteria all over the latter's world, yet he is perfectly content to play tricks, steal, and bully those weaker than him. He and Anpanman were born at the same time, making them physical representations of moral dualism. He has a weakness to soap, which shrinks him to the size of a fly. He constructs machines and thinks of intricate plans to counteract Anpanman's strength. His two famous phrases are his battle cry, "Ha-hi-hu-he-ho!" (based on the h-row of Japanese kana); and "Bye-baikiiin!", which he utters out whenever he's sent flying by Anpanman or another character. On the English TMS Entertainment website, he was called Bacteriaman. In the English Tubi Dub, he keeps his original Japanese name. Anpanman and his main enemy Baikinman combine in the view of the media expert Thomas Hoeren elements of Milton Paradise Lost, Frankenstein (Roman) and Star Trek In Japanese his name sounds like bikeinman.
 
 Baikinman's henchmen. They have the ability to rot Anpanman's head with mildew/mold (Japanese: kabi). They first appeared in episode 2a. In the English Tubi dub, they're called Rot-Rot.
 
  (1988–2017), Rei Sakuma (2017 Christmas Special), Miina Tominaga (2018–present), Krystal Valdes (English)
 Baikinman's female partner in crime. She is selfish, demanding, childish, and greedy, but sometimes shows kindness, as demonstrated by her crush on Shokupanman. Her Japanese name is a combination of "Doki", the Japanese onomatopoeia for a quickly beating heart, "baikin" (meaning "germ", also the case for Baikinman), and the diminutive/affectionate suffix "-chan". She first appeared in episode 13a. On the English TMS Entertainment website, she was called Spark, however in the English Tubi dub she's called Dokeen
 
  (1991–2016), Kazuki Yao (2017–present), Rio Chavarro (English)
 A skeleton who often works with Baikinman and Dokin-chan. Although he seems scary on the outside, he is very weak and often falls to pieces, and can magically put the pieces back. He is neither a hero nor a villain. His special attack is the Bone Boomerang, where he takes off one of his bones and throws it. He is also in love with Dokin-chan and often stalks her. He first appeared in Fly! Fly! Chibigon. In the English Tubi dub, he is called Horror.

Media

Picture books 
The Anpanman picture book series debuted in October 1973. Froebel-kan has published over 150 picture books under different series labels consisting of a varying amount of picture books. Takashi Yanase wrote and illustrated the picture books until 2013, following his retirement from his career and eventual death.

Manga 
Takashi Yanase created three different manga series based on the character.

 January 1975 – May 1976: Nekketsu Märchen Kaiketsu Anpanman (熱血メルヘン 怪傑アンパンマン)
 Serialized in Sanrio's monthly poetry magazine Shi to Märchen (詩とメルヘン) for which Yanase was the editor-in-chief. Unlike all other iterations, this one is aimed at adults. The entire series is included in the box-set Yanase Takashi Taizen (やなせたかし大全), published in 2013 by Froebel-kan.
 September 1976 – July 1982: Anpanman (あんぱんまん / アンパンマン)
 Serialized in Sanrio's monthly youth magazine Gekkan Ichigoehon (月刊いちごえほん). The series changed its title spelling from hiragana to katakana in January 1981 and ended when the magazine folded in July 1982. It remained commercially unavailable until 2016 when it was collected in its entirety into the volume Dare mo shiranai Anpanman (だれも知らないアンパンマン) by Fukkatsu Dotcom.
 January 1, 1990 – May 29, 1994: Tobe! Anpanman (とべ!アンパンマン)
 A full color comic strip serialized in the Sunday edition of Yomiuri Shinbun. In 1991 Froebel-kan published a selection of strips into three bilingual volumes, marketing them as English learning tools for children age 3+. Unlike traditional tankoubon, these volumes are presented in a vertical "Garfield Format". The rest of the series run is currently commercially unavailable.

Anime 
The first anime adaptation of Anpanman, consisting of a single episode, aired during Spring Break Children's Hiroba - Picture Book on NHK General TV on March 13, 1979. Like the early picture books, Anpanman's name in the title was written in hiragana (あんぱんまん) instead of katakana. The anime was narrated by Meiko Nakamura. Although the character designs were closer to the picture books released under the Kinder Picture Books label, the story and the worldview were almost the same as the second anime adaptation.

The second anime adaptation of Anpanman, entitled Soreike! Anpanman (それいけ!アンパンマン, Let's Go! Anpanman), is produced by TMS Entertainment. Over 1300 episodes have aired on NTV since October 3, 1988. In April 2020, it was reported the voice recordings have had been put on hold due to the COVID-19 pandemic. On October 2, 2020, it was announced that the voice actors will now be recording lines in separate booths in order to minimize the spread of COVID-19. They will also be taking shifts.

The anime series also received an English dub in India (along with other regional languages) which was aired on Pogo TV in 2009.

Full-length movies 
There are currently a total of 33 full-length films based on the Soreike! Anpanman anime series. The films are also produced by TMS Entertainment and have been released in Japanese theaters every year since 1989. Since at least 1995, the films have been released concurrently with storybook versions written and illustrated by Takashi Yanase himself. Each movie has the same general plot - A person (usually a princess) comes from a foreign land. Baikinman unlocks some dark secret and controls a weapon or monster able to polymorph people. And with the help of the aforementioned person, Anpanman defeats the said weapon or monster. Sometimes the person dies but is brought back to life by a tearful song from the characters.

In May 2020, it was announced that production on the thirty-first Anpanman film Soreike! Anpanman: Fuwafuwa Fuwari to Kumo no Kuni (それいけ! アンパンマン ふわふわフワリーと雲の国, Let's Go! Anpanman: Fluffy Fuwari and the Cloud Country) had also been delayed due to the pandemic. The film was slated to be released on June 26, 2020. In June 2020, the film was delayed to 2021.

In 2021, TMS Entertainment dubbed ten Anpanman movies into English and Spanish exclusively for Tubi. The first movie Apple Boy and Everyone's Hope was released on April 15, 2021 (which was the first Takashi Yanase anime production since Ringing Bell to be presented in the English dub). The second movie Anpanman: Purun, the Soap Bubble was released on July 23, 2021. Seven other films were released on September 10, 2021. The tenth movie Anpanman: Twinkle! Princess Vanilla of Ice Cream Land was released on November 12, 2021.

 March 11, 1989: 
 July 14, 1990: 
 July 20, 1991: 
 March 14, 1992: 
 July 17, 1993: 
 July 16, 1994: 
 July 29, 1995: 
 July 13, 1996: 
 July 28, 1997: 
 July 25, 1998: 
 July 24, 1999: 
 July 29, 2000: 
 July 14, 2001: 
 July 13, 2002: 
 July 12, 2003: 
 July 17, 2004: 
 July 16, 2005:  (Dubbed as Anpanman: The Adventure of Happie in English on September 10, 2021)
 July 15, 2006:  (Dubbed as Anpanman: Star-Spirited Dollie in English on September 10, 2021)
 July 14, 2007:  (Dubbed as Anpanman: Purun, the Soap Bubble in English on July 23, 2021)
 July 12, 2008:  (Dubbed as Anpanman: The Secret of Fairy Rin-Rin in English on September 10, 2021)
 July 4, 2009: 
 July 10, 2010:  (Dubbed as Anpanman: Blacknose and the Magical Song in English on September 10, 2021)
 July 2, 2011: 
 July 7, 2012:  (Dubbed as Anpanman: Revive Banana Island in English on September 10, 2021)
 July 6, 2013: 
 July 5, 2014:  (Dubbed as Anpanman: Apple Boy and Everyone's Hope in English on April 15, 2021)
 July 4, 2015: 
 July 2, 2016  (Dubbed as Anpanman: Nanda and Runda from the Star of Toys in English on September 10, 2021)
 July 1, 2017 
 June 30, 2018  (Dubbed as Anpanman: Shine! Kulun And The Stars Of Life in English on September 10, 2021)
 June 28, 2019  (Dubbed as Anpanman: Twinkle! Princess Vanilla of Ice Cream Land in English on November 12, 2021)
 June 25, 2021 
 June 24, 2022 
 June 30, 2023

Animated shorts 
In 1990, Tokyo Movie Shinsha started producing short subject Anpanman movies. These are around 24 minutes (except the second which is a double-length short) that were shown in conjunction with the full-length movies seen above. The shorts made in 1989 and 1993 are not included as they do not involve the world of Anpanman.

 , July 14, 1990
 , July 20, 1991
 , March 14, 1992
 , July 16, 1994
 , July 29, 1995
 , July 13, 1996
 , July 28, 1997
 , July 25, 1998
 , July 24, 1999
 , July 29, 2000
 , July 14, 2001
 , July 13, 2002
 , July 12, 2003
 , July 17, 2004
 , July 16, 2005
 , July 15, 2006
 , July 14, 2007
 , July 12, 2008
 , July 4, 2009
 , July 10, 2010
 , July 2, 2011
 , July 7, 2012
 , July 6, 2013
 , July 5, 2014
 , July 4, 2015

Christmas specials 
In December 1988, Tokyo Movie Shinsha started making Anpanman Christmas specials. A total of 32 Christmas Specials have been made.
 December 19, 1988: 
 December 25, 1989: 
 December 24, 1990: 
 December 23, 1991: 
 December 21, 1992: 
 December 20, 1993: 
 December 19, 1994: 
 December 25, 1995: 
 December 13, 1996: 
 December 25, 1997: 
 December 24, 1998: 
 December 23, 1999: 
 December 21, 2000: 
 December 20, 2001: 
 December 19, 2002: 
 December 25, 2003: 
 December 24, 2004: 
 December 23, 2005: 
 December 22, 2006: 
 December 21, 2007: 
 December 19, 2008: 
 December 25, 2009: 
 December 24, 2010: 
 December 23, 2011: 
 December 21, 2012: 
 December 20, 2013: 
 December 19, 2014: 
 December 18, 2015: 
 December 23, 2016:

Video games 

There are currently a total of 42 video games on this list based on the Soreike! Anpanman anime series, ranging from adventure games to educational games. With the exception of Soreike! Anpanman Eigo to Nakayoshi 2 Tanoshii Carnival, the video games were released only in Japan.

 Famicom
 Oeka Kids: Anpanman to Oekaki Shiyou!!
 Oeka Kids: Anpanman no Hiragana Daisuki
 Soreike! Anpanman: Minna de Hiking Game!

 PlayStation
 Kids Station: Soreike! Anpanman
 Kids Station: Soreike! Anpanman 2: Anpanman to Daibouken
 Kids Station: Soreike! Anpanman 3
 Kids Station: Oshaberi Oekaki Soreike! Anpanman

 Nintendo DS
 Soreike! Anpanman: Baikinman no Daisakusen
 Anpanman to Asobo: Aiueo Kyoushitsu
 Anpanman to Asobo: ABC Kyoushitsu
 Anpanman to Touch de Waku Waku Training
 Anpanman to Asobu: Aiueo Kyoushitsu DX

 Nintendo 3DS
 Anpanman to Asobo: New Aiueo Kyoushitsu

 Game Boy Color
 Soreike! Anpanman: Fushigi na Nikoniko Album
 Soreike! Anpanman: 5tsu no Tou no Ousama

 Wii
 Anpanman Niko Niko Party

 Sega Pico
 Soreike! Anpanman Eigo to Nakayoshi Youchiende ABC
 Soreike! Anpanman no Game de Asobou Anpanman
 Soreike! Anpanman no o-Hanashi Daisuki Anpanman
 Soreike! Anpanman Eigo to Nakayoshi 2 Tanoshii Carnival
 Soreike! Anpanman no Medalympic World
 Soreike! Anpanman no Minna de Kyousou Anpanman!
 Soreike! Anpanman: Anpanman to Denwa de Asobou!
 Soreike! Anpanman Anpanman to Tanoshii Drive!
 Soreike! Anpanman Anpanman to Kotoba Asobi
 Soreike! Anpanman no Medalympic World 2
 Soreike! Anpanman: Anpanman to Suuji Asobi 
 Anpanman Pico Waku Waku Pan Koujou
 Anpanman to PC Renshuu!
 Gakken Anpanman to Chinou Up!
 Soreike! Anpanman: Anpanman no Chie no World
 Soreike! Anpanman Hajimete Asobu Pico Soft: Anpanman no Iro-Kazu-Katachi Nurie mo Dekichau zo!
 Soreike! Anpanman: Anpanman no Hitori de Dekichatta!

 Advanced Pico Beena
 Soreike! Anpanman Hajimete Kaketa yo! Oboeta yo! Hiragana Katakana ~Gojūon Board Kinō-tsuki~
 Shoku Iku Series 1 Soreike! Anpanman: Sukikirainai Ko Genki na Ko!
 Anpanman no Waku Waku Game Oekaki
 Anpanman o Sagase!
 Soreike! Anpanman Card de Tanoshiku ♪ ABC
 Soreike! Anpanman Doki Doki! Rescue Drive ~Car Navi-tsuki~
 Soreike! Anpanman o Mise ga Ippai! TV de o-Ryōri Tsukutchao
 Soreike! Anpanman Waku Waku Eigo Game!

 Arcade
 Let's Go! Anpanman: Popcorn Factory

 Playdia
 Soreike! Anpanman: Picnic de Obenkyō

Theme music

Openings

Endings

Reception 
In 2011, research by Bandai found Anpanman to be the most popular fictional character among people aged 0 to 12 in Japan for 10 consecutive years. Anpanman overtook Hello Kitty as Japan's top-grossing character in 2002, and was Japan's top-grossing character .

Retail sales 
By 2006, the Anpanman books had sold over 50million copies in Japan. By the time Takashi Yanase passed away in 2013, the Anpanman picture books had sold 68million copies. As of February 2019, Anpanman has sold more than 80million books. , Bandai Namco has sold  Anpanman PC units since 1999, including tablet computers.

Retail sales of Anpanman related products grossed an annual revenue of at least  consecutively for nearly 30 years.

Box office

Legacy 

There are five museums across Japan that are dedicated to Anpanman, such as the Yokohama Anpanman Children's Museum & Mall. There is also the Yanase Takashi Memorial Hall, a museum dedicated to Takashi Yanase himself.

Anpanman train livery is featured on some of JR Shikoku trains, such as the JR Shikoku 2000 series DMU and the JR Shikoku 8000 series EMU.

The Anpanman Official Shop Taipei, the first overseas Anpanman shop specializing in products related to the series, opened at the Shin Kong Mitsukoshi shopping mall in Taipei on September 10, 2015.

Anpanman inspired the manga and anime series . It is a webcomic/manga series created by One, with the title a play on the titular character.

The K-pop group BTS released a song in their hit album Love Yourself: Tear under the name "Anpanman" with many references to the series.

See also 
 Mighty Cat Masked Niyander
 Takoyaki Mantoman

References

External links 

  Official Anime Site
  NTV's Official Anpanman site
  Official Movie site
  VAP's Official Anpanman Site
  Kids Station's Official Anpanman Site
  BS NTV's Official Anpanman Site
  Tokyo Movie Shinsha's Official Anpanman Site
  Froebel-kan's Official Anpanman Site
 
 

 
1973 manga
1988 Japanese television series debuts
1990s preschool education television series
2000s preschool education television series
2010s preschool education television series
2020s preschool education television series
Animated preschool education television series
Anime postponed due to the COVID-19 pandemic
Anime productions suspended due to the COVID-19 pandemic
Anime series based on manga
Children's manga
Comedy anime and manga
Films postponed due to the COVID-19 pandemic
Japanese children's animated comedy television series
Japanese children's animated fantasy television series
Japanese children's animated superhero television series
Manga adapted into films
Manga adapted into television series
Nippon TV original programming
Superheroes in anime and manga
TMS Entertainment
Works originally published in Japanese newspapers